Kazimierz Dolny Castle, originating from the thirteenth and fourteenth-century, is a Romanesque castle ruins located in Kazimierz Dolny, Lublin Voivodeship in Poland.

See also
 Castles in Poland

References

Castles in Lublin Voivodeship
Puławy County